The Tour of Ulster is a road bicycle racing stage race held around the Irish province of Ulster, divided between the Republic of Ireland and Northern Ireland. It was first run in 1956. It is rated as a National Event on the Union Cycliste Internationale's race classification system. The most prolific winner is Irish rider Sé O Hanlon, who won the race four times between 1961 and 1966.

It is currently sponsored by Victus Renewable Energy and so is known as the Victus Tour of Ulster.

Previous winners

References

External links

Cycle races in Ireland
Cycle races in the United Kingdom
Recurring sporting events established in 1956
1956 establishments in Ireland
1956 establishments in Northern Ireland
Men's road bicycle races